Gilles Grelet is a French theorist and former student of the French philosopher François Laruelle. He is the author of books and pamphlets which develop the main tenets of Laruellean non-philosophy. Following years of teaching, he lives as a sailor.

Thought
Grelet's theory of rebellion draws most conspicuously on the work of Guy Lardreau and Christian Jambet, whose 1976 jointly authored book L'Ange marries Lacanian psychoanalysis and Maoism.

Aside from his published writings, Grelet has collaborated with French underground filmmakers Dojo Cinéma.

He co-founded with François Laruelle and Ray Brassier a book collection, Nous, les sans philosophie, published by L'Harmattan, comprising key works by exponents of Laruelle's non-standard matrix of theory (Jacques Fradin, Hugues Choplin, Patrick Fontaine, Patrice Guillamaud...).

Laruellean scholar Ekin Erkan details the Marxist/political praxis of an amalgam of François Laruelle's students, noting that "[i]t is mirthless to seek a revolutionary ethos in Laruelle – his critique solely provides us with the appropriate tools and [ . . . ] the ethics with which to problematize philosophy. Laruelle’s contemporaries, such as his anarcho-Maoist student, Gilles Grelet, have weaponized Laruelle to radicalize non-philosophy and pose an antiphenomenological practice."

References

Bibliography

Original works 
Déclarer la gnose. D'une guerre qui revient à la culture (Paris: L'Harmattan, 2002).

Co-authored works 
Citations pour le Président Sarkozy, with illustrations by Juan Pérez Agirregoikoa (Montreuil: Editions Matière, 2009).
Le théorisme, méthode de salut public/Faible passion du réel, with illustrations by Juan Pérez Agirregoikoa (Montreuil: Editions Matière, 2006).
Discipline hérétique, with François Laruelle, Danilo de Almeida and Tony Brachet (Paris: Kimé, 1999).

Edited works 
Théorie-rébellion. Un ultimatum (Paris: L'Harmattan, 2005). (Includes contributions from Jason Barker, Ray Brassier, Oliver Feltham and François Laruelle).

Living people
French male writers
Year of birth missing (living people)